We Own the Night is the debut EP by American rapper Jim Jones. The EP was released on December 3, 2013, by Vampire Life. The EP features guest appearances from Ricky Blaze, TWO, Jeremih, DJ Spinking, Charlie Rock, Trav, Mel Matrix and Philthy Rich. On July 4, 2013, the EP's first single "Nasty Girl" featuring Jeremih and DJ Spinking was released.

Track listing

References

2013 debut EPs
Jim Jones (rapper) albums